Islam is the third largest religion in Nepal. According to the 2011 Nepal census, approximately 1.164 million Muslims, comprising 4.4% of the population, live in Nepal.

Demographics

According to the 2011 Nepal census, there are around 1.164 million Muslims in Nepal. Almost all of them live in Terai Region. Districts with large Muslim concentrations are: Rautahat, Banke, Kapilvastu, Parsa, Mahottari, Bara, and Sunsari. There are only 21,866 Muslims in the capital city of Kathmandu (1.25% of the total population).

Ahmadis maintain a small presence in Nepal.

The Muslim population of Nepal as an estimation research by Pew Research Center is around 1,312,370 (4% of the country's population) as of the year 2020, which is down from 4.4% in 2011 census report.

Decadal percentage of Muslims  in Nepal

See also 
Religion in Nepal
Islam in South Asia
List of mosques in Nepal

References

External links
 
 
 Sijapati, Megan Adamson. Islamic Revival in Nepal: Religion and a New Nation. New York and London, Routledge Press, 2011. South Asia edition, Delhi 2013.